The Shilha people, or Ishelhien, are a Berber subgroup primarily inhabiting the Anti Atlas, High Atlas, Sous Valley, and Soussi coastal regions of Morocco.

Overview
The Shilha people traditionally call themselves ishelhien. This endonym is rendered as les Chleuh in French. The Ishelhien are also known as Shluh and Schlöh. Among Arabic speakers, Chleuh serves as an appellation for Berbers generally, although Imazighen is the proper Berber self-name for Berbers as a whole.

The Shilha people live mainly in Morocco's southern Atlantic coast, the High Atlas Mountains, the Anti Atlas mountains, and the Sous Valley. They are of Berber origin, which along with the Berber people, includes other ethnic subgroups such as the Tuareg, Rif, Kabyle, Shawia and Guanche. The Shilha people are a part of Morocco's Berber-speaking community, and the southernmost residing Berber population.

History

In antiquity, Berbers traded with the Phoenicians and Carthaginians in commercial entrepots and colonies along the northwestern littoral. They established the ancient kingdom of Mauretania, which fell under Roman rule in 33 CE, before eventually being reunited under Berber sovereignty. During the 7th century, the Islamic Umayyad Caliphate invaded the Berber and Byzantine strongholds in the Northwest Africa, seizing Carthage in 698 AD. Although the Umayyads nominally controlled Morocco over the following years, their rule was tenuous due to Berber resistance. Shortly in 739 AD, Umayyad Arabs were defeated by the Berbers at the battle of Nobles and Bagdoura. Morocco remained under the rule of Berber kingdoms such as Barghawata and Midrar... etc. In 789 AD, with the approval of the locals, a former Umayyad courtier established the Idrisid dynasty that ruled in Fez. It lasted until 970 AD, as various petty states vied for control over the ensuing centuries. After 1053, Morocco was ruled by a succession of Muslim dynasties founded by Berber tribes. Among these were the Almoravid dynasty (1053-1147) who spread Islam in Morocco, the Almohad dynasty (1147-1275), and the Marinid dynasty (1213-1524). In 1668, a sharifan family from the east assumed control and established the incumbent Alawite dynasty.

The French and Spanish colonial empires partitioned Morocco in 1904, and the southern part of the territory was declared a French protectorate in 1912. Arabization remained an official state policy under both the colonial and succeeding post-independence governments. With the spread of the Berber Spring in Algeria to Berber territory during the 1980s, the Berbers sought to reaffirm their Berber roots.

Society

The Ishelhien mainly live in Morocco's Atlas Mountains and Sous Valley. Traditionally, they are farmers who also keep herds. Some are semi-nomadic, growing crops during the season when water is available, and moving with their herds during the dry season.

The Ishelhien communities in the southwestern mountains of Morocco cooperated with each other in terms of providing reciprocal grazing rights as seasons changed, as well as during periods of war. These alliances were re-affirmed by annual festive gatherings, where one Shilha community would invite nearby and distant Shilha communities.

Language

The Ishelhien speak Tashelhit, a Berber language. It belongs to the Berber branch of the Afro-Asiatic family. Their language is sometimes referred to as Sous-Berber.

As of 2014, there were around 4.7 million Shilha speakers, constituting 14.1% of the Moroccan population.

Tashelhit differs considerably from some other Berber languages, such as those spoken by the Tuareg.

Naming 
This name is morphologically a feminine noun, derived from masculine  "male speaker of Shilha".

The origin of the names Aclḥiy and Taclḥiyt is still unknown. The first appearance of this name in a western printed source is found in Mármol's Descripcion general de Affrica (1573, part I, book I, chapter XXXIII):

"...and among the Numidians and Getulians of the western part of Afri-ca, they speak Berber with marked local features, and there they call this language Xilha [ʃilħa] and Tamazegt [tamaziɣt], which are very old names."

Now it is used as an endonym among Shilha speakers. Some people and sources say that it is exonymic in origin, as the nominal stem šlḥ goes back to the Arabic noun  "bandit" (plural ). But this meaning is only present in the eastern dialects of Arabic; it does not exist in Maghreb dialects, and this is the weakness of this thesis. Also, the majority of those who tried to search for the etymology of the word used foreign-language dictionaries, rather it was supposed to search for the relevant language first. This is mainly due to the fact that the proponents of this hypothesis were not Shilha speakers.

There are a lot of attempts to explain this name based on the language of Tachelhit. The most logical one of them is by the writer Mohammed Akdim, who emphasized in one of his contributions, that the name Shluh, in fact, is the original name given by the original inhabitants of Morocco, Masmouda in the High Atlas and the possessions of Marrakesh, Souss and the Anti-Atlas On themselves. In Shilha, the verb  means "to settle down, reside and live", which indicates that the name  means "settled and settled residents or settled residents". As for going to its interpretation and explanation in the Arabic language, this is the height of linguistic prejudice in the right of the Amazigh.

People of Shilha descent

 Aziz Akhannouch
 Mohammed al-Mokhtar Soussi
 Saadeddine Othmani
 Saïd Taghmaoui
 Abdallah ibn Yasin
 Ibn Tumart
 Abu Zakariya Yahya
 Abu Muhammad Abd al-Wahid ibn Abi Hafs
 Faycal Fajr
 Oudaden
 Ammouri Mbarek
 Youssouf Hadji
 Mustapha Hadji
 Yunis Abdelhamid
 Youssef Aït Bennasser
 Mbark Boussoufa
 Mohammed Khaïr-Eddine
 Hassan Kachloul
 Mohamed Bensaid Ait Idder
 Issam Chebake
 Walid Azaro
 Hicham El Majhad
 Saadia Himi
 Hassan Arsmouk

See also

High Atlas

Further reading
"Ishelhiyen", Encyclopædia Britannica online, 2008, webpage: EB-Ishelhiyen.

References

External links
Maroc - Carte linguistique

 
Berber peoples and tribes
Berbers in Morocco
Ethnic groups in Morocco